This is a list of Equipment of the Indonesian Air Force currently in service, as well as former equipment.

Aircraft

Aircraft Munitions

Air Defense Artillery

Radars

Ground Vehicles

Small arms

Retired Aircraft
Below is a list of some notable aircraft previous operated by the Armed Forces of Indonesia.

See also
 Equipment of the Indonesian Army
 Equipment of the Indonesian Navy
List of equipment of the Indonesian National Police
List of aircraft of the Indonesian National Armed Forces

Notes

Bibliography

References

Indonesian Air Force
Indonesian Air Force